Selakeh (also known as Seh Lakeh) is a village in Mokriyan-e Gharbi Rural District, in the Central District of Mahabad County, West Azerbaijan Province, Iran. At the 2006 census, its population was 109, in 20 families.

References 

Populated places in Mahabad County